President Snakes is the fourth album from the nerd-folk duo The Doubleclicks, released on August 11, 2015.  The album was funded via Kickstarter with a goal of $30,000. The goal was achieved within the first few days of the campaign's launch. It exceeded this and raised $55,535, on June 2, 2015.

Production 
On May 7, 2015, The Doubleclicks sought funding for the album via the crowd-funding site Kickstarter, asking for $30,000. On June 2, 2015, the Kickstarter campaign ended with $55,535 from 1,282 backers. Kickstarter rewards include a coloring book and a tabletop role-playing game called Fiasco. In an interview with OregonLive.coms David Greenwald, Laser Malena-Webber says "[i]t's the most honest and personal stuff we've put out, it's not all funny and it's not all nerdy."

Track listing

Tour 
On October 17, 2015, The Doubleclicks performed at Zappcon in Fresno, California.  On August 16, 2016, it was announced that both The Doubleclicks and Lucia Fasano would begin their tour Snakes On The Radio in the cities Santa Clara, California, Oakland, California, Burbank, California, West Hollywood, California, and Portland, Oregon. The Doubleclicks said they would play both their old songs and newer songs from their latest album President Snakes. Lucia Fasano would play songs from their debut album Radio Silence.

Reception 
In anticipation of the new album, many publications wrote favorably of the band. GeekDads Jonathan H. Liu stated "[t]he Doubleclicks are a GeekDad favorite." The Mary Sues Teresa Jusino said "[w]e love the geek girl sounds of The Doubleclicks, and we know you do, too!" Portland Tribunes Pamplin Media Group has called their music "funny, sweet and insightful songs about dinosaurs, cats, Netflix, space and the Dungeons and Dragons game."

On September 12, 2015, President Snakes debuted at #4 on Billboards Comedy Albums chart and moved to #2 the following week.

References

External links 
 

2015 albums
The Doubleclicks albums
Kickstarter-funded albums